South Paulding High School is a public high school located in Paulding County, Georgia, United States. Opened in 2006, South Paulding is a part of the Paulding County School District. Beginning its second year (2007–2008), a 12th grade class was added and the student body was composed of 1657 students.

Demographics

The student body of South Paulding is  76.1 percent Caucasian, 19.7 percent African American, 2.4 percent Hispanic, 0.4 percent Asian, and 1.4 percent other races.

Athletics

South Paulding offers basketball, football, softball, volleyball, wrestling, cheerleading, cross-country, baseball, soccer, tennis, dance, esports, golf, and track and field. They compete in region 5 of the GHSA AAAAAA.

Notable alumni

 Michael Carter II - NFL defensive back, New York Jets
 Caleb Lee Hutchinson - American Idol runner up

References

2006 establishments in Georgia (U.S. state)
Educational institutions established in 2006
Public high schools in Georgia (U.S. state)
Schools in Douglas County, Georgia